The French language surname De Guignes literally means "from Guignes"/"of Guignes". It may refer to:

Joseph de Guignes (1721–1800), French orientalist, sinologist and Turkologist 
Chrétien-Louis-Joseph de Guignes (1759–1845), French merchant-trader, ambassador and scholar

See also
de Guigné

French-language surnames
Toponymic surnames